The 2006 Virginia Tech Hokies football team represented Virginia Polytechnic Institute and State University during the 2006 NCAA Division I FBS football season.  The team's head coach was Frank Beamer. The team tallied a 10–3 record, going 10–2 during the regular season before losing 31–24 in the 2006 Chick-fil-A Bowl against the Georgia Bulldogs.

Preseason
Virginia Tech began the season ranked #16 in the USA Today Coaches Poll and #17 in the Associated Press Poll after going 11–2 (7–1 ACC) in 2005 and winning the Coastal division of the Atlantic Coast Conference.

See also 2006 NCAA Division I-A football rankings

Schedule

Game summaries

Northeastern

North Carolina

Duke

Cincinnati

Georgia Tech

Boston College

Southern Miss

Clemson

Miami

Kent State

Wake Forest

Virginia

Georgia

Rankings

Personnel

Coaching staff

Roster

Discipline issues

The first half of Virginia Tech's season was characterized by a lack of discipline for the Hokies, both on and off the field.

 Safety Aaron Rouse was penalized twice against Duke for roughing the passer. His second hit on Duke quarterback Thaddeus Lewis was a helmet-to-sternum hit that whiplashed his head with such force that it gave him a concussion. Duke's backup quarterback said of Tech, "They are a fast team. I'm lucky to come out in one piece. ... The roughing of the passer, the late hits, they were coming for us."
 DE Chris Ellis and WR Josh Morgan were arrested late Saturday night after the Hokies' victory over Cincinnati and charged with resisting arrest and obstructing justice. Morgan was also charged with disorderly conduct. Both players were suspended for the following game, a home loss to Georgia Tech and were later sentenced to one year of probation and 100 hours of community service.
 WR Josh Hyman was suspended for the Boston College game after an arrest for driving under the influence.
 During the ESPN broadcast of the Boston College game, announcer Kirk Herbstreit became angry when cameras showed Tech players Vince Hall and Aaron Rouse arguing on the sidelines and showed linebacker Brendan Hill dancing on the sidelines with Tech trailing late in the game. The video of Herbstreit's rant was shown to the Tech team in Sunday meetings following the game.

Tech's discipline troubles came to a head when the Hokies were blown out in consecutive weeks by Georgia Tech and Boston College. Beamer responded by cracking down on trash-talking, personal fouls, and other negative behaviors. The team responded and committed no personal fouls and only two defensive penalties total in the three games following the BC loss.

Defense
Virginia Tech finished the regular season leading the nation in total defense, scoring defense, and pass defense.  This was the second year in a row that defensive coordinator Bud Foster's unit had led the nation in total defense.

References

Virginia Tech
Virginia Tech Hokies football seasons
Virginia Tech Hokies football